Diaphania oeditornalis is a moth in the family Crambidae. It was described by George Hampson in 1912. It is found in Guatemala and Venezuela.

The length of the forewings is 13.2–14 mm for males and 13.5–15 mm for females. There is a costal and terminal brown band on the forewings, as well as a translucent white area, with a light purp1e gloss and a few yellowish scales on the anal margin. The hindwings have an external brown band.

References

Moths described in 1912
Diaphania